Jack Lyons may refer to:

Jack Lyons (cricketer) (1863–1927), Australian cricketer
Jack Lyons (diver), Canadian diver
Jack Lyons (financier) (1916–2008), British entrepreneur and philanthropist
Jack Lyons (footballer, born 1912) (1912–1988), Australian rules footballer for Geelong
Jack Lyons (footballer, born 1919) (1919–1955), Australian rules footballer for Essendon and North Melbourne
Jack Lyons (soccer) (born 1901), American soccer player
J. B. Lyons (Jack Binignus Lyons, 1922–2007), Irish medical historian and writer

See also
John Lyons (disambiguation)
Jack Lyon, New Zealand politician